The Musée Préfectoral de Kissidougou is a regional museum in Kissidougou, Guinea. Created in 1971, it is noted for its collection of masks, which are believed to have magical powers.

In a 2019 interview, the museum director discussed a major renovation of the museum.

See also 
 List of museums in Guinea

References

External links
Photo of African castanet at museum, which is a postcard.

Museums in Guinea